The Jadotville Medal, is a campaign medal which can only be issued to the members of "A" Company, 35th Infantry Battalion who fought during the Siege of Jadotville in 1961. "A" Company, under the command of Commandant Pat Quinlan, was part of the Irish Army forces participating in the United Nations peacekeeping operations in Congo.  The medal depicts a Celtic warrior and the shoulder badge that was worn by all Irish UN soldiers in the Congo. Also depicted on the medal are the words Cosaint Chalma (Valiant Defence) and Misneach (Courage).

References

External links
 
 

Orders, decorations, and medals of Ireland
Campaign medals
Awards established in 2017